The 18th Ibero-American Championships in Athletics were held at the Estadio Chan Chan in Trujillo, Peru, between August 24–26, 2018.
A total of 44 events were contested, 22 by men and 22 by women.

Medal summary

Men

Women

Medal table

Participating nations
A total of 262 athletes from 17 countries participated.

 (18)
 (12)
 (29)
 (18)
 (14)
 (7)
 (5)
 (50)
 (1)
 (8)
 (45)
 (9)
 (10)
 (5)
 (24)
 (5)
 (2)

References

Results 

Ibero-American Championships in Athletics
Ibero-American Championships in Athletics, 2018
Ibero-American Championships
Ibero-American Championships
Ibero-American Championships in Athletics